The following television stations broadcast on digital channel 30 in the United States:

 K21IF-D in Hanksville, Utah
 K30AE-D in Alva, Oklahoma
 K30AF-D in Alexandria, Minnesota, on virtual channel 9, which rebroadcasts WFTC
 K30AL-D in Iola, Kansas
 K30BN-D in Coos Bay, Oregon
 K30BU-D in Leadore, Idaho
 K30CN-D in Ely, Nevada
 K30DC-D in Dove Creek, etc., Colorado, on virtual channel 30
 K30DS-D in Lovelock, Nevada
 K30DT-D in Flagstaff, Arizona
 K30EJ-D in Crested Butte, Colorado, on virtual channel 13, which rebroadcasts K13AV-D
 K30EK-D in Dulce & Lumberton, New Mexico
 K30EW-D in Monument, etc., Oregon
 K30FN-D in St. James, Minnesota
 K30FO-D in Peetz, Colorado, on virtual channel 2, which rebroadcasts KWGN-TV
 K30FP-D in Santa Rosa, New Mexico
 K30FS-D in Hawthorne, Nevada
 K30FV-D in Cambridge, Nebraska
 K30FY-D in Guymon, Oklahoma
 K30FZ-D in Willmar, Minnesota, on virtual channel 9, which rebroadcasts WFTC
 K30GA-D in Garfield County, Utah
 K30GG-D in Chloride, Arizona
 K30GJ-D in Colfax, New Mexico
 K30GL-D in Many Farms, Arizona
 K30GM-D in Capitan/Ruidoso, New Mexico
 K30GO-D in Pleasant Valley, Colorado, on virtual channel 2, which rebroadcasts KWGN-TV
 K30GU-D in Morongo Valley, California, on virtual channel 30
 K30GV-D in Shoshoni, Wyoming
 K30HA-D in Yuma, Colorado, on virtual channel 9, which rebroadcasts KUSA
 K30HB-D in Agana, Guam
 K30HD-D in Tucumcari, New Mexico
 K30HH-D in Memphis, Texas
 K30HJ-D in Cortez, etc., Colorado
 K30HY-D in Verdi/Mogul, Nevada
 K30JB-D in Morgan, etc., Utah, on virtual channel 2, which rebroadcasts KUTV
 K30JD-D in Prescott, Arizona, on virtual channel 5, which rebroadcasts KPHO-TV
 K30JE-D in Lihue, Hawaii
 K30JG-D in Randolph & Woodruff, Utah
 K30JM-D in Colorado Springs, Colorado
 K30JP-D in Sayre, Oklahoma
 K30JQ-D in Carbondale, Colorado
 K30JS-D in Yreka, California
 K30JT-D in La Pine, Oregon
 K30KC-D in Samak, Utah, on virtual channel 14, which rebroadcasts KJZZ-TV
 K30KE-D in Wanship, Utah
 K30KG-D in Coalville, etc., Utah
 K30KH-D in Emery, Utah
 K30KJ-D in Manti & Ephrain, Utah, on virtual channel 16, which rebroadcasts KUPX-TV
 K30KK-D in Fountain Green, Utah
 K30KM-D in Vernal, etc., Utah, on virtual channel 4, which rebroadcasts KTVX
 K30KQ-D in Jackson, Minnesota
 K30KU-D in Silver City, New Mexico
 K30KV-D in Crownpoint, New Mexico
 K30KX-D in Taos, New Mexico
 K30KY-D in Philipsburg, Montana
 K30LB-D in Beowawe, Nevada
 K30LC-D in Tampico, etc., Montana
 K30LD-D in Wichita Falls, Texas
 K30LF-D in Duchesne, Utah, on virtual channel 2, which rebroadcasts KUTV
 K30LL-D in Kingman, Arizona
 K30LS-D in Sandpoint, Idaho
 K30LY-D in Manila, etc., Utah
 K30MC-D in Lewiston, Idaho
 K30MG-D in Kirksville, Missouri
 K30MH-D in Overton, Nevada
 K30MJ-D in Libby, Montana
 K30MM-D in Gila River Indian Community, Arizona, on virtual channel 30
 K30MN-D in Barstow, California
 K30MW-D in Sweetgrass, etc., Montana
 K30MX-D in Wyodak, Wyoming
 K30NY-D in Victorville, etc., California, on virtual channel 30
 K30OA-D in Milton-Freewater, Oregon
 K30OC-D in Cottage Grove, Oregon
 K30OE-D in Alton, Utah
 K30OF-D in Baker Valley, Oregon
 K30OG-D in La Grande, Oregon
 K30OI-D in Camp Verde, Arizona
 K30OJ-D in Las Vegas, New Mexico
 K30OK-D in Tulsa, Oklahoma
 K30OL-D in Washington, etc., Utah, on virtual channel 7, which rebroadcasts KUED
 K30OM-D in Monterey, California
 K30ON-D in Capitol Reef National Park, Utah
 K30OO-D in Caineville, Utah
 K30OQ-D in Fremont, Utah
 K30OR-D in Escalante, Utah
 K30OT-D in Tropic/Cannonville, Utah
 K30OU-D in Cody, etc., Wyoming
 K30OV-D in Boulder, Utah
 K30OW-D in Fishlake Resort, Utah
 K30OX-D in Montpelier, Idaho
 K30OY-D in Logan, Utah, on virtual channel 4, which rebroadcasts KTVX
 K30PA-D in Roseau, Minnesota
 K30PB-D in Shurz, Nevada
 K30PC-D in Henefer & Echo, Utah
 K30PD-D in Kanab, Utah
 K30PE-D in Parowan, Enoch etc., Utah
 K30PF-D in Fillmore etc., Utah
 K30PG-D in Delta/Oak City, etc, Utah
 K30PH-D in Beaver, etc., Utah
 K30PI-D in Garrison, Utah
 K30PJ-D in Beryl/New Castle/Modena, Utah
 K30PK-D in Kanarraville, etc., Utah
 K30PM-D in Price, Utah
 K30PN-D in Green River, Utah
 K30PO-D in Scofield, Utah
 K30PP-D in Ferron, Utah
 K30PQ-D in Clear Creek, Utah
 K30PR-D in Pahrump, Nevada
 K30PT-D in Kalispell & Lakeside, Montana
 K30PW-D in Salmon, Idaho
 K30PX-D in Winnemucca, Nevada
 K30PY-D in Parlin, Colorado
 K30PZ-D in Litchfield, California
 K30QA-D in Coeur D'Alene, Idaho
 K30QB-D in Shreveport, Louisiana
 K30QC-D in Ridgecrest, California, on virtual channel 7, which rebroadcasts KABC-TV
 K30QD-D in Ontario, etc., Oregon
 K30QE-D in Panaca, Nevada
 K30QG-D in Alexandria, Louisiana
 K30QH-D in Burley, etc., Idaho
 K30QI-D in Alamogordo, New Mexico
 K30QV-D in Iowa, Louisiana
 K30QX-D in Duluth, Minnesota
 K30QY-D in Oakland, Minnesota
 K30RA-D in Racine, Minnesota
 K38MK-D in Cheyenne Wells, Colorado
 K40IX-D in Antimony, Utah
 KABB in San Antonio, Texas
 KAHC-LD in Sacramento, California, on virtual channel 43
 KBAD-LD in Pago Pago, American Samoa
 KBLN-TV in Grants Pass, Oregon
 KBZO-LD in Lubbock, Texas
 KCAU-TV in Sioux City, Iowa
 KCVU in Paradise, California
 KDFS-CD in Santa Maria, California
 KDNU-LD in Las Vegas, Nevada
 KFOL-CD in Houma, Louisiana
 KFSN-TV in Fresno, California
 KGBD-LD in Great Bend, Kansas
 KGWN-TV in Cheyenne, Wyoming
 KJLA in Ventura, California, uses KXLA's spectrum, on virtual channel 57
 KKAF-LD in Fayetteville, Arkansas
 KKPD-LD in Tyler, Texas
 KLJB in Davenport, Iowa
 KLPD-LD in Denver, Colorado, on virtual channel 28
 KLRT-TV in Little Rock, Arkansas
 KMBB-LD in North Platte, Nebraska
 KMPX in Decatur, Texas, on virtual channel 29
 KOAB-TV in Warm Springs, Oregon
 KOMO-TV in Seattle, Washington, on virtual channel 4
 KOTV-DT in Caney, Kansas
 KPDX in Vancouver, Washington, an ATSC 3.0 station, on virtual channel 49
 KPLE-CD in Killeen, Texas
 KPTH in Sioux City, Iowa
 KPXE-TV in Kansas City, Missouri, on virtual channel 50
 KQED in San Francisco, California, on virtual channel 9
 KQEH in San Jose, California, uses KQED's spectrum, on virtual channel 54
 KQFX-LD in Columbia, Missouri
 KQSY-LD in Corpus Christi, Texas
 KSMI-LD in Wichita, Kansas
 KSTC-TV in Minneapolis, Minnesota, on virtual channel 5
 KTAB-TV in Abilene, Texas
 KTVX in Salt Lake City, Utah, on virtual channel 4
 KUAT-TV in Tucson, Arizona
 KUNW-CD in Yakima, Washington
 KWPL-LD in Santa Fe, New Mexico
 KWWT in Odessa, Texas
 KXJB-LD in Fargo, North Dakota
 KXKW-LD in Lafayette, Louisiana
 KXLA in Rancho Palos Verdes, California, on virtual channel 44
 KXLN-DT in Rosenberg, Texas, on virtual channel 45
 KYW-TV in Philadelphia, Pennsylvania, on virtual channel 3
 KZCO-LD in Denver, Colorado, uses KLPD-LD's spectrum, on virtual channel 7
 W30BU-D in Green Bay, Wisconsin
 W30CO-D in Wheeling, West Virginia
 W30CS-D in Zionville, North Carolina
 W30CV-D in Hilton Head Island, South Carolina
 W30DM-D in Manchester, etc., Vermont
 W30DN-D in Manteo, North Carolina
 W30DZ-D in Fence, Wisconsin
 W30EB-D in Kingston, Pennsylvania
 W30ED-D in Guayama, Puerto Rico, on virtual channel 44
 W30EE-D in Jacksonville, Florida
 W30EF-D in Jefferson, North Carolina
 W30EG-D in Knoxville, Tennessee
 W30EH-D in Fort Wayne, Indiana
 W30EI-D in Sharon, Pennsylvania
 W30EM-D in Ocala, Florida
 W30ES-D in Columbus, Mississippi
 W30ET-D in Flint, Michigan
 W30EZ-D in Purvis, Mississippi
 W30FA-D in Jasper, Florida
 WAGT-CD in Augusta, Georgia
 WAWW-LD in Rochester, New York
 WAXN-CG in China Grove, North Carolina, on virtual channel 64, which rebroadcasts WAXN-TV
 WBUD-LD in Atlanta, Georgia, on virtual channel 26
 WBUO-LD in Olean, New York
 WCRN-LD in Boston, Massachusetts, on virtual channel 31
 WCZS-LD in Chambersburg, Pennsylvania
 WDBJ in Roanoke, Virginia
 WDCI-LD in Chicago, Illinois, on virtual channel 57
 WDGA-CD in Dalton, Georgia
 WEDH in Hartford, Connecticut, on virtual channel 24
 WEDY in New Haven, Connecticut, uses WEDH's spectrum, on virtual channel 65
 WEFS in Cocoa, Florida, on virtual channel 68
 WEIQ in Mobile, Alabama
 WEIU-TV in Charleston, Illinois
 WELW-LD in Evansville, Indiana
 WFWG-LD in Richmond, Virginia
 WGIQ in Louisville, Alabama
 WHIG-CD in Rocky Mount, North Carolina, on virtual channel 31
 WHIZ-TV in Zanesville, Ohio
 WIAT in Birmingham, Alabama
 WIAV-CD in Washington, D.C., an ATSC 3.0 station, on virtual channel 58
 WKMR in Morehead, Kentucky
 WKPC-TV in Louisville, Kentucky
 WLBT in Jackson, Mississippi
 WLFT-CD in Baton Rouge, Louisiana
 WLOW-LD in Charleston, South Carolina
 WMGT-TV in Macon, Georgia
 WNAB in Nashville, Tennessee, an ATSC 3.0 station, on virtual channel 58
 WNEM-TV in Bay City, Michigan
 WNJJ-LD in New York, New York
 WNYN-LD in New York, New York, on virtual channel 39
 WODK-LD in St. Louis, Missouri, on virtual channel 45
 WPCW (DRT) in Johnstown, Pennsylvania, on virtual channel 19
 WPTG-CD in Pittsburgh, Pennsylvania, on virtual channel 69
 WPXE-TV in Kenosha, Wisconsin, on virtual channel 55
 WQEK-LD in Clarksdale, Mississippi
 WRFB in Carolina, Puerto Rico, on virtual channel 5, which rebroadcasts WORA-TV
 WRMD-CD in Tampa, Florida, on virtual channel 49
 WSCV in Fort Lauderdale, Florida, on virtual channel 51
 WSDI-LD in Indianapolis, Indiana, on virtual channel 30
 WSJV in Elkhart, Indiana
 WSPY-LD in Earlville, Illinois, on virtual channel 31
 WSVW-LD in Harrisonburg, Virginia
 WTCT in Marion, Illinois
 WUNU in Lumberton, North Carolina, on virtual channel 31
 WUTR in Utica, New York
 WVCZ-LD in Valdosta, Georgia
 WVIZ (DRT) in Cleveland, Ohio, on virtual channel 25
 WVUP-CD in Tallahassee, Florida
 WVWW-LD in Vero Beach, Florida
 WWDT-CD in Naples, Florida
 WXII-LD in Cedar, Michigan
 WXMI in Kalamazoo, Michigan
 WYDC in Corning, New York
 WYFF in Greenville, South Carolina
 WYNB-LD in Ellenville, New York, on virtual channel 30
 WZBJ in Danville, Virginia, uses WDBJ's spectrum
 WZCD-LD in Cincinnati-Dayton, Ohio

The following stations, which are no longer licensed, formerly broadcast on digital channel 30 in the United States:
 K30FL-D in Port Angeles, Washington
 K30IV-D in Wallowa, Oregon
 K30KN-D in Wyola, Montana
 K30KR-D in Boise, Idaho
 K30MF-D in Jonesboro, Arkansas
 K30MI-D in Redding, California
 K30MY-D in Jackson, Wyoming
 K30QF-D in Hermiston, Washington
 K30QW-D in Geronimo, Oklahoma
 KCIO-LD in Ontario, California
 W30DW-D in Tifton, Georgia
 W30EX-D in Lima, Ohio
 WAGT in Augusta, Georgia
 WNNB-CD in Beaver, Pennsylvania
 WTBS-LD in Atlanta, Georgia

References

30 digital